Mary Herbert (1686–1775), was a British-Spanish businessperson.

She was a Catholic from a noble family in Wales. In 1727 she was awarded a contract by Conde de Cogorani of Compañia Española to drain and work the Pozo Rico silver mine in Guadalcanal in the Sierra Norte de Sevilla. She emigrated to Spain in 1729 to engaged in this major mining enterprise, with support of the king of Spain. The business met with several setbacks which caused a several-year-long process between Mary Herbert and the English crown until she won the case in 1742.

References

1686 births
1729 deaths
18th-century Welsh businesspeople
18th-century Spanish businesspeople
18th-century British businesswomen